Shiryaikha is a rural locality (a village) and the administrative center of Oshevenskoye Rural Settlement of Kargopolsky District, Arkhangelsk Oblast, Russia. The population was 262 as of 2010. There are 5 streets.

Geography 
Shiryaikha is located 48 km north of Kargopol (the district's administrative centre) by road. Bolshoy Khaluy is the nearest rural locality.

References 

Rural localities in Kargopolsky District